Vyacheslav Vasilievich Sazonov (Вячеслав Васильевич Сазонов, born August 25, 1935, Moscow – February 3, 2002, Moscow) was a Soviet-Russian mathematician, specializing in probability and measure theory. He is known for Sazonov's theorem.

Education and career
In 1958 he graduated from Moscow State University. There he received in 1961 his Ph.D. under Yuri Prokhorov with thesis "Распределения вероятностей и характеристические функционалы" (Probability distributions and characteristic functionals). Sazonov worked in the Steklov Institute of Mathematics from 1958 to 2002. In 1968 he received his Russian doctorate of sciences (Doctor Nauk) with thesis "Исследования по многомерным и бесконечномерным предельным теоремам теории вероятностей" (Investigations of multidimensional, infinite-dimensional and limit theorems of the theory of probabilities). In 1970 he was an Invited Speaker at the ICM in Nice. In 1971 he was awarded the academic title of Professor in Mathematics and became a member of the CPSU. From 1971 to 1999 he was a professor in the Department of Mathematical Statistics, Faculty of Computational Mathematics and Cybernetics, Moscow State University. Professor Sazonov has been deputy editor-in-chief of the journal Theory of Probability and Its Applications for about two decades.

Awards
 USSR State Prize (1979, jointly with Aleksandr A. Borovkov and V. Statulevičius) for a series of works on asymptotic methods in the theory of probability.

Selected publications

References

External links 
 
 Труды Сазонова (publication list in Russian)
 Персональная страница на сайте Общероссийский математический портал (personal page on the site all-Russian mathematical portal mathnet.ru)

1935 births
2002 deaths
Moscow State University alumni
Probability theorists
Soviet mathematicians
20th-century Russian mathematicians